Dendrobium amethystoglossum (amethyst-colored dendrobium) is a species of orchid endemic to the Island of Luzon in the Philippines but cultivated elsewhere as an ornamental.

References

amethystoglossum| amethystoglossum
Endemic orchids of the Philippines
Flora of Luzon
Plants described in 1872